Blaine Air Force Station is a closed United States Air Force General Surveillance Radar station. It was closed in 1979.

History
Blaine Air Force Station was one of twenty-eight stations built as part of the second segment of the Air Defense Command permanent radar network. Prompted by the start of the Korean War, on July 11, 1950, the Secretary of the Air Force asked the Secretary of Defense for approval to expedite construction of the permanent network. Receiving the Defense Secretary's approval on July 21, the Air Force directed the Corps of Engineers to proceed with construction.

The 757th Aircraft Control and Warning Squadron (AC&W Sq) was assigned to Birch Bay AFS, Washington on 27 November 1950. The 757th AC&W Sq began operating a pair of AN/FPS-10 radars in January 1952, and initially the station functioned as a Ground-Control Intercept (GCI) and warning station.  As a GCI station, the squadron's role was to guide interceptor aircraft toward unidentified intruders picked up on the unit's radar scopes.

The site was renamed Blaine Air Force Station on 1 December 1953.  In 1959 Blaine AFS switched to operating an AN/FPS-20 search radar and AN/FPS-6 and AN/FPS-6A height-finder radars.

During 1960 Blaine AFS joined the Semi Automatic Ground Environment (SAGE) system, feeding data to DC-12 at  McChord AFB, Washington.  After joining, the squadron was re-designated as the 757th Radar Squadron (SAGE) on 1 April 1960. The radar squadron provided information 24/7 the SAGE Direction Center where it was analyzed to determine range, direction altitude speed and whether or not aircraft were friendly or hostile.   By 1963 the station had converted to an AN/FPS-24 search radar, and had received an AN/FPS-26A height-finder radar which replaced the AN/FPS-6. On 31 July 1963, the site was redesignated as NORAD ID Z-46.

In addition to the main facility, Blaine operated an AN/FPS-14 Gap Filler site:
 Anacortes, WA   (P-46A) 

Over the years, the equipment at the station was upgraded or modified to improve the efficiency and accuracy of the information gathered by the radars.  The 757th Radar Squadron was inactivated on 30 March 1979 as part of the inactivation of Air Defense Command and the general draw down of air defense radar stations.  Today, much of Blaine AFS remains intact, the station however is scheduled for redevelopment and is to be "Bay Horizon Park".  The park will be a camp, conference and recreation center.   It is unclear which parts of the former Air Force Station will remain and which parts will be torn down.

The Ground-to-Air Transmitter-Receiver (GATR) facility was located off-station roughly 3 miles east of the main station.

Air Force units and assignments

Units
 757th Aircraft Control and Warning Squadron
 constituted as the 757th Aircraft Control and Warning Squadron on 14 November 1950
 Activated at Paine Field, Washington on 27 November 1950
 Moved to Birch Bay, WA on 15 August 1951
 Site renamed Blaine Air Force Station on 1 December 1953
 Redesignated 757th Radar Squadron (SAGE) on 1 April 1960
 Redesignated 757th Radar Squadron on 1 February 1974
 Inactivated on 30 March 1979

Assignments
 505th Aircraft Control and Warning Group, 15 August 1951
 25th Air Division, 6 February 1952
 4704th Defense Wing, 1 January 1953
 25th Air Division, 8 October 1954
 Seattle Air Defense Sector, 1 March 1960
 25th Air Division, 1 April 1966 - 30 March 1979

See also
 List of USAF Aerospace Defense Command General Surveillance Radar Stations

References

 Cornett, Lloyd H. and Johnson, Mildred W., A Handbook of Aerospace Defense Organization  1946 - 1980, Office of History, Aerospace Defense Center, Peterson AFB, CO (1980).
 Winkler, David F. & Webster, Julie L., Searching the Skies, The Legacy of the United States Cold War Defense Radar Program, US Army Construction Engineering Research Laboratories, Champaign, IL (1997).
 Information for Blaine AFS, WA

Installations of the United States Air Force in Washington (state)
Semi-Automatic Ground Environment sites
Aerospace Defense Command military installations
1951 establishments in Washington (state)
1979 disestablishments in Washington (state)
Military installations established in 1951
Military installations closed in 1979